CASI or Casi may refer to:

Acronyms
 Canadian Aeronautics and Space Institute
 Canadian Association of Snowboard Instructors
 China Aerospace Studies Institute, a research institute of the United States Department of the Air Force
 Center for the Advanced Study of India, at the University of Pennsylvania, US
 Club Atlético San Isidro, a rugby club in San Isidro, Bueno Aires, Argentina
 Cognitive Abilities Screening Instrument
 Computer-assisted self interviewing
 Continental Air Services, Inc, an airline

Other uses
 "Casi" (song), a 2003 song by Soraya
 Chashi or casi, hilltop forts of the Ainu
 Casi (given name)